"Kublai Khan" is a single by hip hop duo Jedi Mind Tricks, released in 2003 through Babygrande Records . The song was the second single released from the duo's third album Visions of Gandhi, following "Animal Rap", and followed by "Rise of the Machines". "Kublai Khan" is a sequel to the group's 2000 single "Genghis Khan", this time, named after Genghis' grandson Kublai Khan. The song, like "Genghis Khan", features an intense symphonic sample, courtesy of group producer Stoupe the Enemy of Mankind. New York City rapper Tragedy Khadafi, who appeared on "Genghis", also appears on the track. Former JMT member Jus Allah, who split from the group in 2001, is replaced by Goretex, of the group Non Phixion.

Track listing

A-Side
"Kublai Khan" (Dirty Version) (feat. Goretex and Tragedy Khadafi)

B-Side
"Kublai Khan" (Radio Version) (feat. Goretex and Tragedy Khadafi)
"Kublai Khan" (Instrumental)

Song order
First verse: Vinnie Paz
Second verse: Goretex
Third verse: Tragedy Khadafi

2003 singles
2003 songs
Jedi Mind Tricks songs
Cultural depictions of Kublai Khan